Feschaeria is a genus of moths within the Castniidae family.

Selected species
Feschaeria amycus (Cramer, [1779])
Feschaeria meditrina Hopffer, 1856

References 

Castniidae